William Macleay may refer to:

William Sharp Macleay (1792–1865), British/Australian entomologist
William John Macleay (1820–1891), British/Australian zoologist (cousin of William Sharp Macleay)

See also
William Maclay (disambiguation)